The 2003 AFL Women's National Championships took place in Darwin, Northern Territory, Australia. The tournament began on 19 June and ended on 24 June 2003. The 2003 tournament was the 12th Championship. The Senior-vics of Victoria won the 2003 Championship, defeating Queensland in the final. It was Victoria's 12th consecutive title.

Ladder
  Victoria-Senior
  Queensland
  Northern Territory
  Western Australia
  Australian Capital Territory
  South Australia
  New South Wales
 Australian Defence Force

External links
National Results from the AFL site

2003
2003 in Australian rules football
AFL